Tai Tong Wu is a village in Sha Tau Kok, North District, Hong Kong.

Administration
Tai Tong Wu is a recognized village under the New Territories Small House Policy. It is one of the villages represented within the Sha Tau Kok District Rural Committee. For electoral purposes, Tai Tong Wu is part of the Sha Ta constituency, which is currently represented by Ko Wai-kei.

References

Villages in North District, Hong Kong